Valeria Sergeyevna Koblova, née Zholobova (born 9 October 1992, in Moscow Oblast) is a Russian freestyle wrestler. She competed in the freestyle 55 kg event at the 2012 Summer Olympics; she advanced to the bronze medal match, where she was defeated by Yuliya Ratkevich. At the 2014 World Wrestling Championships she lost in the final match to 10-time World champion and 4-time Olympic champion Kaori Icho. At the 2016 Summer Olympics she lost in the gold medal match to Kaori Icho. She is Grand Master of Sports in freestyle wrestling.

References

External links
 

1992 births
Living people
Russian female sport wrestlers
Olympic wrestlers of Russia
Wrestlers at the 2012 Summer Olympics
People from Yegoryevsk
World Wrestling Championships medalists
Wrestlers at the 2015 European Games
European Games competitors for Russia
Wrestlers at the 2016 Summer Olympics
Olympic silver medalists for Russia
Olympic medalists in wrestling
Medalists at the 2016 Summer Olympics
European Wrestling Championships medalists
Wrestlers at the 2020 Summer Olympics
Sportspeople from Moscow Oblast
20th-century Russian women
21st-century Russian women